The Banner of Joan is an epic poem by H. Warner Munn. It was first published in 1975 by Donald M. Grant, Publisher, Inc. in an edition of 975 copies in honor of Munn's appearance as Guest of Honor at the first World Fantasy Convention. The poem concerns Joan of Arc and may be seen as an epilogue to Munn's Merlin novels.

Notes

References

External links
 

1975 poetry books
Epic poems in English
American poems
1975 poems
Works about Joan of Arc
Donald M. Grant, Publisher books